Tonna is a genus of large sea snails, marine gastropod molluscs in the family Tonnidae, the tun or cask shells.

Description
The thin shell is ventricose, inflated, generally globular, rarely oblong and encircled with ribs. The spire is short. The outer lip is crenulated and sometimes denticulated throughout its whole length. The oblong aperture is very large and emarginated inferiorly. The columella is channeled. There is no operculum.

The animal is very large, so as scarcely to be contained within its shell. The head is broad, swollen before, supporting two long, slender, obtuse, distant tentacles, dilated towards the base, where the eyes are situated. The mouth is large, muscular, strong and retractile. The respiratory tube is pretty stout. Its cavity is capacious, entirely open, provided with two branchiae placed on the left side, the larger of which, describes a pretty large semicircle. The trunk is cylindrical, very much developed, flexible, capable of being turned in every direction at the will of the animal, and of elongating itself in a remarkable manner.  It is furnished internally with several rows of hooks. The foot is ovate, large, fleshy, bordering all parts of the shell. It is rounded, widened, lobed and dilated before, with a horizontal furrow. The posterior extremity has no trace of an. operculum. The generative organ of the male is very retractile. <ref name="Kiener">Kiener (1840). General species and iconography of recent shells : comprising the Massena Museum, the collection of Lamarck, the collection of the Museum of Natural History, and the recent discoveries of travellers; Boston :W.D. Ticknor,1837 (described as  'Dolium)</ref>

The genus Tonna comprehends a small number of species, some of which attain so remarkable a growth, that they are sometimes as large as a man's head. In fact the general appearance of the shell, of an inflated, thick-set form, calls up the image of a tun, whence is derived its generic name. Thus, the characters which make up these species are a form more or less inflated, girdled, and very globular. The spire is much shorter than the body whorl. This causes the size of the aperture, which almost always occupies two thirds of the length of the shell. 

The animals of the tuns are in general strongly colored, and painted with different tints which form bands and spottings upon their entire exterior. 

Distribution
This marine species is cosmopolitan.

Species
Species within the genus Tonna include:
 
 Tonna alanbeui  Vos, 2005
 Tonna allium (Dillwyn, 1817)
 Tonna ampullacea (Philippi, 1845)
 Tonna berthae  Vos, 2005
 Tonna boucheti  Vos, 2005
 Tonna bozzettii T. Cossignani, 2021
 Tonna canaliculata (Linnaeus, 1758)
 Tonna chinensis Dillwyn, 1817
 Tonna cumingii (Hanley in Reeve, 1849)
 Tonna deshayesii (Reeve, 1849)
 Tonna dolium (Linnaeus, 1758)
 Tonna dunkeri (Hanley, 1860)
 Tonna galea (Linnaeus, 1758)
 Tonna hawaiiensis  Vos, 2007
 Tonna lischkeana (Küster, 1857)
 Tonna luteostoma (Küster, 1857)
 Tonna melanostoma (Jay, 1839)
 Tonna morrisoni  Vos, 2005
 Tonna oentoengi  Vos, 2005
 Tonna pennata (Mörch, 1853)
 Tonna perdix (Linnaeus, 1758)
 Tonna poppei Vos, 2005
 Tonna rosemaryae  Vos, 1999
 Tonna sulcosa (Born, 1778)
 Tonna tankervillii (Hanley, 1860)
 Tonna tenebrosa (Hanley, 1860)
 Tonna tessellata (Lamarck, 1816)
 Tonna tetracotula  Hedley, 1919
 Tonna variegata (Lamarck, 1822)
 Tonna zonata (Green, 1830)

Species brought into synonymy

 Tonna cepa (Röding, 1798): synonym of Tonna canaliculata (Linnaeus, 1758)
 Tonna cerevisina Hedley, 1919: synonym of  Tonna tankervillii (Hanley, 1860)
 Tonna chinensis Hinton, 1972: synonym of  Tonna alanbeui (Vos, 2005)
 Tonna chinensis Zhang & Ma, 2004: synonym of  Tonna boucheti (Vos, 2005)
 Tonna cimingii Hinton, 1974 : synonym of  Tonna poppei (Vos, 2005)
 Tonna costata : synonym of  Tonna allium (Dillwyn, 1817)
 Tonna fasciata (Martini, 1777): synonym of Tonna sulcosa (Born, 1778)
 Tonna fimbriata (G. B. Sowerby I, 1827): synonym of Tonna allium (Dillwyn, 1817)
 Tonna hardyi Bozzetti & Ferrario, 2005 : synonym of  Tonna allium (Dillwyn, 1817)
 Tonna haurakiensis (Hedley, 1919): synonym of Tonna tankervillii (Hanley, 1860)
 Tonna maculata (Lamarck, 1822): synonym of Tonna dolium (Linnaeus, 1758)
 Tonna maculosa (Dillwyn, 1817): synonym of Tonna pennata (Mörch, 1853)
 Tonna maoria Powell, 1938 : synonym of  Tonna cumingii (Hanley in Reeve, 1849)
 Tonna marginata (Philippi, 1845): synonym of Tonna lischkeana (Küster, 1857)
 Tonna niasensis Wissema, 1947 †: synonym of Tonna sulcosa (Born, 1778)
 Tonna olearium (Linnaeus, 1758): synonym of Tonna galea (Linnaeus, 1758)
 Tonna oentoengi Dharma, 2005 : synonym of  Tonna oentoengi (Vos, 2005)
 Tonna parvula (Tapparone Canefri, 1878): synonym of Tonna tessellata (Lamarck, 1816)
 Tonna perdix Steyn & Steyn, 2002 : synonym of  Tonna dunkeri (Hanley, 1860)
 Tonna planicostata Dodge, 1956: synonym of Tonna canaliculata (Linnaeus, 1758)
 Tonna pyriformis (G. B. Sowerby III, 1914): synonym of Eudolium crosseanum (Monterosato, 1869)
 Tonna variegata Kilburn, 1971 : synonym of  Tonna dunkeri (Hanley, 1860)
 Tonna variegata Suter, 1913 : synonym of  Tonna tankervillii (Hanley, 1860)

References

 Rovereto, G. 1899. Prime ricerche sinonimiche sui generi dei gasteropodi. Atti della Società Ligustica de Scienze Naturali e Geografiche 10: 101-110
 Iredale, T. & McMichael, D.F. 1962. A reference list of the marine Mollusca of New South Wales. Memoirs of the Australian Museum 11: 1-109
 Vaught, K.C. (1989). A classification of the living Mollusca. American Malacologists: Melbourne, FL (USA). . XII, 195 pp
 Wilson, B. 1993. Australian Marine Shells. Prosobranch Gastropods. Kallaroo, Western Australia : Odyssey Publishing Vol. 1 408 pp.
 Gofas, S.; Le Renard, J.; Bouchet, P. (2001). Mollusca, in: Costello, M.J. et al. (Ed.) (2001). European register of marine species: a check-list of the marine species in Europe and a bibliography of guides to their identification. Collection Patrimoines Naturels, 50: pp. 180-213
 Rolán E., 2005. Malacological Fauna From The Cape Verde Archipelago. Part 1, Polyplacophora and Gastropoda Beu, A. G. (2005) Neogene fossil tonnoidean gastropods of Indonesia. Scripta Geologica 130, p. 1-186, pp. 166, figs. 327
 Vos, C. (2007). A conchological Iconography (No. 13) - The family Tonnidae. 123 pp., 30 numb. plus 41 (1 col.) un-numb. text-figs, 33 maps., 63 col. pls, Conchbooks, Germany
 Beu, A.G., Bouchet, P. & Tröndlé, J. 2012. Tonnoidean gastropods of French Polynesia. Molluscan Research 32(2): 61-120
 Vos, C. (2012) Overview of the Tonnidae (MOLLUSCA: GASTROPODA) in Chinese waters. Shell Discoveries 1(1); pp. 12-22; Pls. 1-9
 Vos, C. (2013) Overview of the Tonnidae (Mollusca: Gastropoda) in Chinese waters. Gloria Maris 52(1-2); pp. 22-53; Pls. 1-9

External links
 Brünnich, M. & Stejneger, L. 1772. Zoologiae Fundamenta Praelectionibus Academicis Accomodata. pp. 254
 Röding, P.F. 1798. Museum Boltenianum sive Catalogus cimeliorum e tribus regnis naturae quae olim collegerat Joa. Hamburg : Trappii 199 pp. 
 Lamarck, J.B.P.A. de 1801. Systeme des animaux sans vertebres, ou tableau general des classes, des ordres et des genres de ces animaux. Paris : Chez Deterville 432 pp.
 Link, H.F. 1807. Beschreibung der Naturalien Sammlung der Universität zu Rostock. Rostock : Alders Erben. 
  Montfort, P.D. de 1810. Conchyliologie Systematique, et Classification Methodique des Coquilles. Paris : F. Schoell Vol. 2 676 + 16 pp.
 Iredale, T. 1931. Australian molluscan notes. No. 1. Records of the Australian Museum 18(4): 201-235, pls xxii-xxv
 Forbes, E. 1852. On the Mollusca collected by Mr MacGillivray during the voyage of the Rattlesnake. pp. 360-386 in MacGillivray, J. (ed). Narrative of the Voyage of H.M.S. Rattlesnake, commanded by the late Captain Owen Stanley, R.N., F.R.S. etc, during the years 1846-1850. London : Lords Commissioners of the Admiralty Vol. II 395 pp.

Further reading
 Powell A. W. B., New Zealand Mollusca'', Auckland, New Zealand 1979 

Tonnidae
Gastropod genera
Taxa named by Morten Thrane Brünnich